Manes is an unincorporated community in Wright County, Missouri, United States. It is located on Route 95, approximately 12 miles northeast of Hartville.

A post office called Manes was established in 1890, and remained in operation until 1977. The origin of the name "Manes" is uncertain.

References

Unincorporated communities in Wright County, Missouri
Unincorporated communities in Missouri